Melicope triphylla is a plant in the family Rutaceae. The specific epithet  is from the Greek meaning "three leaf", referring to the trifoliolate leaves.

Description
The flowers are unisexual.

Distribution and habitat
Melicope triphylla grows naturally in the Ryukyu Islands and Taiwan south to Borneo and east to New Guinea. In Malaysian Borneo its habitat is forests from sea-level to  altitude.

References

External links

triphylla
Flora of Malesia
Flora of Borneo
Flora of New Guinea
Flora of the Ryukyu Islands
Flora of Taiwan
Plants described in 1788
Taxa named by Jean-Baptiste Lamarck